Calotheca is the name used for a genus of choanoflagellates in the family Acanthoecidae, though this name is a junior homonym of the name Calotheca Heyden, 1887, and it must be replaced under the rules of the ICZN. The species C. alata is from Indo-Pacific Localities.

References

External links 

Eukaryote genera
Choanoflagellatea